The European Astronaut Corps is a unit of the European Space Agency (ESA) that selects, trains, and provides astronauts as crew members on U.S. and Russian space missions. The corps has 13 active members, able to serve on the International Space Station (ISS). The European Astronaut Corps is based at the European Astronaut Centre in Cologne, Germany. They can be assigned to various projects both in Europe (at ESTEC, for instance) or elsewhere in the world, at NASA Johnson Space Center or Star City.

Current members
As of 2023 are six active members of the European Astronaut Corps. Five of the six were selected in 2009, and one was selected in 2015.

All of the current members of the corps have flown to space and have visited the ISS. French astronaut Thomas Pesquet is the member of the corps who has accumulated the most time in space with 396 days, 11 hours and 34 minutes. He is the record holder for all the European astronauts in history. The corps currently includes one woman, Samantha Cristoforetti, who formerly held the record for the longest spaceflight by a woman. Timothy Peake, a member of the 2009 group, retired in 2023.

2009 Group 
On 3 April 2008, ESA director general Jean-Jacques Dordain announced that recruiting for a new class of European astronauts will start in the near future. The selection program for 4 new astronauts was launched on 19 May 2008 with applications due by 16 June 2008 so that final selection would be due spring 2009. Almost 10,000 people registered as astronaut candidates as of 18 June 2008. 8,413 fulfilled the initial application criteria. From these 918 were chosen to take part in the first stage of psychological testing which led to 192 candidates on 24 September 2008. After two stage psychological tests 80 candidates continued on to medical evaluation in January–February 2009. 40 or so candidates head to formal interviews to select four new members to European Astronaut Corps.

2022 Group 
Recruitment for the 2022 ESA Astronaut Group took place over 2021-22 and added five "career" astronauts as well as for the first time a "reserve pool" of 11 astronaut candidates, and also a person with a physical disability through the "parastronaut feasibility project".

The funding by NASA and Russia of the International Space Station is currently planned to end in 2030. Thanks to their involvement with NASA's Orion programme, ESA will receive three flight opportunities for European astronauts to the Lunar Gateway.

Former members
There are 18 former members of the ESA astronaut corps.

Some ESA astronauts were selected by other European agencies and then enrolled into the European Astronaut Corps in 1998.

European astronauts outside of ESA

Interkosmos 
Ten Europeans became astronauts within the Soviet Union's Interkosmos program, which allowed citizens of allied nations to fly missions to the Salyut 6, Salyut 7 and Mir space station.
  Aleksandr Panayotov Aleksandrov
  Jean-Loup Chrétien
  Bertalan Farkas
  Mirosław Hermaszewski
  Georgi Ivanov
  Sigmund Jähn
  Dumitru Prunariu
  Vladimír Remek
  Helen Sharman
  Franz Viehböck

Space Shuttle 
NASA trained and flew astronauts from allied nations on the Space Shuttle, especially as payload specialists for scientific missions such as Spacelab. Prior to the foundation of the ESA astronaut corps, both the French CNES and the German DLR had selected their own rosters of astronauts, notably in preparation for the introduction of the ISS. The following people flew on various Shuttle missions.

  Patrick Baudry
  Jean-Jacques Favier
  Dirk Frimout
  Reinhard Furrer
  Leonid Kadeniuk
  Franco Malerba
  Ulrich Walter

Mir 
The following people flew on missions to Mir under agreements between their nations and Russia.
  Ivan Bella
  Klaus-Dietrich Flade

Space Shuttle missions
Astronauts from the European Astronaut Corps participated in several NASA Space Shuttle missions before the ISS era, in particular as Spacelab payload specialists. NASA considered the full-time ESA astronauts as payload specialists, but offered some the opportunity to train with its own astronauts and become NASA mission specialists. (This list excludes missions to Mir or the ISS)

As Payload Specialists
 Ulf Merbold – STS-9 (Spacelab),  STS-42 (Spacelab)
 Reinhard Furrer – STS-61-A (Spacelab-D1 Mission)
 Wubbo Ockels – STS-61-A (Spacelab-D1 Mission)
 Hans Schlegel – STS-55 (Spacelab-D2 Mission)
 Ulrich Walter – STS-55 (Spacelab-D2 Mission)

As Mission Specialists 
 Claude Nicollier – STS-46, STS-61 (Hubble), STS-75, STS-103 (Hubble)
 Maurizio Cheli – STS-75
 Jean-François Clervoy – STS-66, STS-103 (Hubble)
 Gerhard Thiele – STS-99
 Pedro Duque – STS-95

Missions to the Mir space stations
Astronauts from Europe have flown to Mir both on board Soyuz vehicles (as part of the Euromir programme) or on board the Space Shuttle.

 Jean-Loup Chrétien – Aragatz (1988) 
 Helen Sharman – Project Juno (1991) 
 Franz Viehböck – Austromir '91 (1991) 
 Klaus-Dietrich Flade – Mir '92 (1992) 
 Michel Tognini – Antarès (1992) 
 Jean-Pierre Haigneré – Altair (1993) 
 Ulf Merbold – Euromir '94 (1994) 
 Thomas Reiter – Euromir '95 (1995) 
 Claudie Haigneré – Cassiopée (1996) 
 Reinhold Ewald – Mir '97 (1997) 
 Jean-Loup Chrétien – STS-86 (1997) 
 Léopold Eyharts – Pégase (1998) 
 Jean-Pierre Haigneré – Perseus (1999) 
 Ivan Bella – Stefanik (1999)

Missions to the International Space Station
European astronauts to have visited the ISS are:

Future missions to the International Space Station
Future European astronauts to the ISS are:

See also
Canadian Astronaut Corps
JAXA Astronaut Corps
NASA Astronaut Corps
List of astronauts by selection
Human spaceflight
History of spaceflight
European contribution to the International Space Station

References

External links 

 The European Astronaut Corps

European Space Agency
Lists of astronauts
European astronauts
Human spaceflight programs